Last Chance to See is a 1989 BBC radio documentary series and its accompanying book, written and presented by Douglas Adams and Mark Carwardine. In the series, Adams and Carwardine travel to various locations in the hope of encountering species on the brink of extinction. The book was published in 1990.

In 2009, the BBC broadcast a television follow-up series of the same name, with Stephen Fry replacing the late Adams.

In 1985, Douglas Adams went to Madagascar in search of the (possibly extinct) lemur the aye-aye. The trip was part of a project by the World Wide Fund for Nature and British Sunday newspaper The Observer, sending well-known authors to remote places to seek endangered species and write articles for The Observer Magazine, to help raise awareness of ecological issues.  Adams was met in Madagascar by zoologist Mark Carwardine (who was working for the WWF at the time). The Observer project was successful, and Adams and Carwardine developed a radio series around the same concept for BBC Radio 4. Carwardine later said:

"We put a big map of the world on a wall, Douglas stuck a pin in everywhere he fancied going, I stuck a pin in where all the endangered animals were, and we made a journey out of every place that had two pins."

The journeys undertaken were to see:
 The aye-aye in Madagascar
 The Komodo dragon on the island of Komodo in Indonesia
 The kākāpō in New Zealand
 The mountain gorilla in Zaire
 The northern white rhinoceros in Zaire
 The Yangtze river dolphin in China
 The Rodrigues fruit bat on the island of Rodrigues, Mauritius
 The Amazonian manatee in Brazil
 The Juan Fernández fur seal on the Juan Fernández Islands, Chile

Radio

The aye-aye programme was broadcast on BBC Radio 4 on 1 November 1985 as a pilot; six further episodes were then broadcast in 1989:
 The kakapo - 4 October
 The Yangtze river dolphin - 11 October
 The Amazonian manatee - 18 October
 The Rodrigues fruit bat - 25 October
 The Komodo dragon - 1 November
 The Juan Fernández fur seal - 8 November

The mountain gorilla and northern white rhino, although the subject of chapters in the book, did not appear in the radio series.

Book
In 1990, an accompanying book was published in the UK, describing the various adventures that duo had encountered on journeys, often with a comic tone. The book covers most of the radio episodes, but excludes the Juan Fernández fur seal and the Amazonia Manatee.  It includes some colour photographs taken by Carwardine.

The first American hardcover edition was published by Harmony Books in 1991 (under ) and the first German paperback edition was published in 1992 by Heyne (under ). These editions carry slightly different photographs of the journeys. An abridged audiobook, read by Adams, was also published.

In the posthumous biography and essay collection, The Salmon of Doubt, Adams describes Last Chance to See as his favourite work.

CD ROM 

The Voyager Company also published a 2 CD-ROM set (for Microsoft Windows 3.1 and Macintosh System 6), in 1992, featuring over 800 still photographs, Adams reading the nearly complete book, Carwardine reading fact files on the species they searched like side bars, and extracts from the BBC Radio 4 series.

Television series 

In 2009, the BBC broadcast a TV follow-up series, in which Stephen Fry, a friend of the late Adams, accompanies Carwardine on a journey to see what has changed in the 20 years since the radio broadcasts. The series excludes the Rodrigues fruit bat, the Yangtze river dolphin, which is "in all probability extinct", and the Juan Fernandez fur seal, which had proved embarrassingly easy for Adams and Carwardine to find.

References

Further reading
 Book extracts:
 
 
 
 Adams, D., Carwardine, M., Last Chance to See (Windows CD-ROM set),  The Voyager Company, New York, 1992.
 Gaiman, N., Don't Panic – Douglas Adams & the Hitch Hiker's Guide to the Galaxy,  Titan Books, London, 1993

External links 

Last Chance to See - BBC programme guide
Douglas Adams: Parrots the Universe and Everything – Douglas Adams gives a talk centered around the book Last Chance to See

1990 non-fiction books
1990 in the environment
Environmental non-fiction books
Collaborative non-fiction books
Books by Douglas Adams
British documentary radio programmes
Documentary films about nature
Pan Books books